Martin Wright  (born 23 June 1974 in Germany) is a British bobsledder who competed for Great Britain at the 2006 Winter Olympics.

At the 2006 Winter Olympics held in Turin, Italy, Wright competed in the men's four-man bobsleigh in a team that included brothers Karl and Lee Johnston. The British team finished in 17th position.

References

1974 births
Bobsledders at the 2006 Winter Olympics
British male bobsledders
Living people
Olympic bobsledders of Great Britain